The Warrior is a 2015 Russian sports drama film directed by Alexey Andrianov, starring Sergey Bondarchuk Jr. and Vladimir Yaglych.

The film tells the story of two brothers, professional mixed martial arts athletes and their father, a fighting coach. The picture's plot bears strong similarity with the 2011 American film of the same name.

The film was released in Russian rental on October 1, 2015 by Central Partnership. The film received three nominations for the Golden Eagle Award: Best Cinematography, Best Film Music and Best Film Editing.

Plot
The film tells the story of two brothers - Roman and Slava, who decide to play in the bouts of the MMA series: Roman wants to help financially the family of his deceased colleague, who was shot by Somali pirates, and Slava is driven by a number of reasons: because of the plight of the family, his wife works as a stripper, and his wages for the utilization of cars are not enough to feed the family and cure a sick daughter who urgently needs an expensive operation.

Slava received a severe trauma to the skull as a child, and if he is hit in the head, he may die. Roma asks his father to become his coach, despite their difficult relationship, due to his alcoholism.

In the ring, Roma and Slava win victories one after another, and become even in the final battle. Slava uses a stifling technique, forcing Roma to surrender. In the final scene of the film Slava's daughter boxes with him, which gives hope that the necessary operation has been performed on her and she is healthy, that all the members of this family are communicating.

Cast
 Sergey Bondarchuk Jr. as Roma Rodin, younger brother
  as Vyacheslav 'Slava' Rodin, elder brother
 Fyodor Bondarchuk as Andrey Rodin, father of Roma and Slava
 Svetlana Khodchenkova as Ekaterina 'Katya' Rodina, Slava's wife
 Ulyana Kulikova as Natasha Rodina, Katya and Slava's daughter
 Yury Yakovlev-Sukhanov as Kostya, trainer
 Aleksandr Novin as Tosha, Slava's trainer
 Aleksandr Baluev as Kulikov, TV presenter
 Batu Khasikov as cameo
 Kamil Hajiyev as cameo
 Vladimir Sychev as businessman
 Mikhail Vodzumi as Vaughn
 Maria Andreyeva as Dana
 Vladimir Selivanov as Amundsen
  as Masha
  as sergeant

Production
Regarding the comparison of the film with the 2011 American film Warrior, Fyodor Bondarchuk answered:
It seems to me that these are two different films, two different souls. But we understand that there will be comparisons, and we went for this experiment. In addition, it is an explosive mixture of various literary materials collected around the world.

According to the film's producer Dmitriy Rudovskiy, the plot film is close to the American film Warrior, but is based on the original script “Taste for Blood” by David Frigerio, the rights to which were bought by the movie company Art Pictures Studio.

Filming 
Filming took place in Kaliningrad and the surrounding area (Baltiysk, Yantarny, Svetlogorsk), as well as in Moscow.

The film was shot in 33 days. Eight battles of the tournament were filmed in four days.

Release
The film was released in Russia on October 1, 2015 by Central Partnership.

References

External links
 

2010s sports drama films
Mixed martial arts films
Films about brothers
Russian sports drama films
2015 martial arts films
Films about dysfunctional families
Martial arts tournament films
2015 drama films
2015 films
Remakes of American films
Films involved in plagiarism controversies
Films produced by Fyodor Bondarchuk
2010s Russian-language films
Lionsgate films